HMS Charger is an  built by Watercraft Limited, Shoreham-by-Sea and fitted out at Vosper Thornycroft. She is just over 20 metres long and 5.8 metres wide and powered by two Rolls-Royce turbo engines. She has five full-time RN crew, and sails with an RNR training officer and a maximum complement of 12 students. She is attached to the Liverpool University Royal Naval Unit.

Role
Charger provides sea training for members of Liverpool University Royal Naval Unit. In 2011 she deployed to the Baltic, visiting ports in Belgium, the Netherlands, Germany and Denmark and transiting both the Caledonian and Kiel Canals. The ship is affiliated to the Cumbrian town of Maryport and regularly visits the town during deployments and for Remembrance Day ceremonies. In 2012, the ship's frequent visits to Preston resulted in the ship being formally adopted by the people of Preston. In 2013, Charger, became the first Royal Navy vessel in the 21st century to make the journey up the River Weaver to Northwich.

Refit
During a refit in 2016 she was fitted with upgraded engines.

Affiliations
City of Preston, Lancashire
Town of Maryport

 
Liverpool University
Liverpool John Moores University
Lancaster University
Sandbach School 
Merchant Taylors' School, Crosby
TS Tuscan (Connah's Quay Sea Cadets)
TS Caesar (Maryport Solway Sea Cadets)
 Market Drayton RNA

Notes

References

External links

 

 

Archer-class patrol vessels
1986 ships
Ships built in England